Ibn Abi Ramtha al-Tamimi, from Banu Tamim tribe, was a physician who lived during the lifetime of the Islamic prophet Muhammad. He was a skilful practitioner who occasionally practised surgery.

References

Physicians of the medieval Islamic world
7th-century physicians
Banu Tamim
7th-century Arabs